Jimmy Page is a British rock musician, best known as the guitarist and producer for English rock band Led Zeppelin. He has also participated in numerous solo and group projects since Led Zeppelin disbanded in 1980.

Albums

Studio albums

Live albums

Soundtrack albums

Singles

As lead artist

As featured artist

Other appearances

Guest appearances

See also 
Robert Plant discography
Led Zeppelin discography

References

External links 

 

Discographies of British artists
Discography
Rock music discographies